The Public Establishment of the Palace, Museum and National Estate of Versailles (French: Établissement public du château, du musée et du domaine national de Versailles) is a French public establishment founded in 1995, and working under the supervision of the French Ministry of Culture, in order to administer the Palace of Versailles.

It is headed by Catherine Pégard, president of the public establishment, assisted by Beatrix Saule, as director of the National Museum of Versailles and Trianon.

See also
 Musée de l'Histoire de France (Versailles)

Palace of Versailles